Andriy Havryushov (born 24 September 1977) is a professional Ukrainian football defender who plays for Oleksandria in the Persha Liha.

External links 
 Andriy Havryushov on FFU

1977 births
Living people
Ukrainian footballers
FC Zorya Luhansk players
FC Metalurh Donetsk players
FC Nyva Vinnytsia players
Association football defenders